Yuriy Fokin is a former Soviet and Ukrainian midfielder. He is a Ukrainian coach with Tavriya football academy.

On May 19, 2008 Fokin was awarded with the Honorary Diploma of Crimea Supreme Council for being a member of Tavriya Simferopol and winning the 1992 Ukrainian championship. Fokin however in the 1992 Ukrainian Premier League played for Shakhtar Donetsk and played in both Shakhtar's games against Tavriya that season earning in one of them a yellow card.

Upon retiring in 2005, Fokin became a coach in the Tavriya Simferopol football academy.

References

External links
 
 
 Teams' rosters in 1991 season.
 
 Profile at allplayers.in.ua
 Shakhtar's birthdays. Shakhtar Donetsk official website. December 31, 2012.

1966 births
Living people
Footballers from Donetsk
Soviet footballers
Ukrainian footballers
Ukrainian Premier League players
FC Shakhtar Donetsk players
SC Tavriya Simferopol players
SKA Kiev players
FC Naftovyk-Ukrnafta Okhtyrka players
FC Nyva Vinnytsia players
FC Nyva Ternopil players
FC Metalurh Kostiantynivka players
FC Shakhtar Makiivka players
FC Naftokhimik Kremenchuk players
FC Spartak Ivano-Frankivsk players
FC Metalurh Donetsk players
FC Shakhta Ukraina Ukrayinsk players
FC Feniks-Illichovets Kalinine players
Association football midfielders